Nick Tol (born 3 May 1989 in Volendam) is a Dutch professional footballer who plays as a midfielder for RKAV Volendam. He formerly played for FC Volendam.

References

External links
 Voetbal International

1989 births
Living people
Dutch footballers
FC Volendam players
SV Spakenburg players
Eerste Divisie players
Derde Divisie players
People from Volendam
Association football midfielders
Footballers from North Holland